John Leroy Brown (June 10, 1921 – October 20, 2004) was a Canadian politician, who represented the newly created riding of Beaches-Woodbine in the Legislative Assembly of Ontario from 1967 to 1971 as a NDP member.

He was born in Kidder, South Dakota, United States, to Neal J. Brown and Martha Henpim. Brown was an opposition member during a majority Progressive Conservative government led by Premier Bill Davis. He served on six Standing Committees of the Legislative Assembly, including Health and Education and University Affairs. He was a businessman and the founder of Browndale, a company that worked with "emotionally disturbed children". He died in 2004 while on a visit to Newfoundland.

References

External links 
 

2004 deaths
1921 births
Ontario New Democratic Party MPPs
20th-century Canadian legislators